The Algeria national football team manager was first established on 1 January 1963 following the appointment of the country's first national team manager Kader Firoud.

Statistics

Official managers 

Managers in italics were hired as caretakers

Managers

References

External links 
 rsssf.com
 List of Algeria national football team managers

1963 establishments in Algeria
Algeria